Luis Bartolomé de Salazar y Castro (1658–1734) was a Spanish genealogist.

Spanish genealogists
People from Valladolid
1658 births
1734 deaths